Longipenis paradeltidius is a moth in the family Lecithoceridae. It is found in Guangxi, China.

The wingspan is 23 mm. The forewings are dark brown and purplish, with a yellow costal margin patch at three quarters of the costa. The hindwings are brownish black and wider than the forewings.

Etymology
The specific name is derived from Latin para (meaning next to or near) and refers to similarity between this species and Longipenis deltidius.

References

Moths described in 2010
Lecithoceridae